The Snarl of Hate is a 1927 American silent drama film directed by Noel M. Smith and starring Johnnie Walker, Mildred June and Jack Richardson.

Cast
 Johnnie Walker as Charles Taylor / Robert Taylor
 Mildred June as Laura Warren
 Jack Richardson as William Reynolds
 Wheeler Oakman as Boy Maxson

References

Bibliography
 Woods, Richard. Johnnie Walker: Silent Movies' Favorite Son. 1999.

External links
 

1927 films
1927 drama films
1920s English-language films
American silent feature films
Silent American drama films
American black-and-white films
Films directed by Noel M. Smith
1920s American films